The Arion Music Awards (Greek : Μουσικά Βραβεία Αρίων) were the Greek music industry's awards program from 2002 to 2007. The organizer was IFPI along with Mega Channel (2002–06) and ANT1 (2007). The awards were named after ancient Greek poet Arion. Other older Greek music awards were the Pop Corn Music Awards and the Thessaloniki Music Festival and newer awards are the MAD Video Music Awards. The awards were general awards and special awards concerned with the various Greek music genres (Éntekhno, Laiko, Modern Laiko and Pop music. The winners were determined by voting of music producers and music reporters.

General

Best Album

Best Song

Best Male Artist

Best Female Artist

Entechno

Laiko

Modern Laiko

Pop music

Soundtracks

References

External links
 Arion Awards at Mega TV

 
Awards established in 2002
Awards disestablished in 2007